The Jaguar B99 was a concept car designed and developed by the Italian design house Bertone. It was first shown to the public on the Bertone stand at the 2011 Geneva Motor Show. The 4-door saloon was shown in two versions: compact executive (B99) and grand tourer (B99 GT). It was designed by Bertone's Michael Robinson and Adrian Griffiths and was based more on traditional Jaguars of the Geoff Lawson era compared to more recent Jaguars designed by Ian Callum.

B99

The power train was also developed by Bertone as a hybrid; featuring a 1.4 L engine for range extension purposes with two electric motors of  each driving  the rear wheels. Average  emissions were estimated at 30g/km with a claimed 60 mile range electric-only mode.

The B99 name stands for B for Bertone and 99 for Bertone's 99th year in operation.

B99 GT
The GT2 racing version was called the Jaguar B99 GT and is  wider than the standard car and is  lower, while the interior is stripped out and fitted with a roll cage.

Reception
The B99 was reported to be well received at the Geneva Motor Show unveiling and that the B99 might form the basis of a replacement for the previous Jaguar X-Type but Jaguar confirmed that they would not be asking Bertone to develop the concept. Jaguar's Global Brand Director Adrian Hallmark was quoted as saying ‘we appreciate the fact that Jaguar is interesting enough for people to do a concept around. It's not that we are offended by it, or against it - it is just not for us.’

Gallery

References

External links
 Bertone official website Jaguar B99 press release

B99
B99
Rear-wheel-drive vehicles
Cars introduced in 2011
Compact executive cars
Grand tourers
Sedans